Sparta Historic District may refer to:

Sparta Historic District (Sparta, Georgia), listed on the National Register of Historic Places in Hancock County, Georgia
Sparta Historic District (Sparta, Illinois), listed on the National Register of Historic Places in Randolph County, Illinois
Sparta Historic District, a local historic district of Sparta, Ossining, New York